Agnewia tritoniformis is a species of sea snail, a marine gastropod mollusk in the family Muricidae, the murex snails or rock snails.

Description

Distribution
Tasmania, south Australia.

References

Agnewia
Gastropods described in 1833